R. W. Forsyth, often just called Forsyth's, was a group of department stores founded in Glasgow in 1871. The business expanded into Edinburgh in 1906  and London in 1925.

R. W. Forsyth

Robert Wallace Forsyth was born Inveresk, East Lothian in 1843, one of ten children of Mary Wallace and Alexander Forsyth (1806-1891), whose family had farmed near Eddleston, Peeblesshire since the 1700's.

He moved to Glasgow in 1862 where he set up business selling socks, gloves and shirts on Renfield Street. Highly successful, he acquired a group of buildings on the corner of Renfield Street and Gordon Street where, in 1897, he commissioned a bespoke department store designed by architect John James Burnet.

The store, which opened in the late 1890's at a cost in excess of £25,000, was the first major store in Glasgow to have electric lighting throughout. 

In 1906 he expanded the business with a second major store constructed on Princes Street, Edinburgh, opposite Waverley Station. This building was again expanded in 1925 with the construction of an extension at 3 St Andrew Square.  

In 1925 a site was acquired at the junction of Regent Street and Vigo Street in London, and a new building was constructed bearing the historic name 'Vigo House'.  Designed by Messrs Sir John Burnet, Tait and Lorne, this building was said to rank among the finest examples of British shop architecture.

Forsyth was married to Martha Sproull and they had thirteen children. He died on 31 January 1937 and is buried in Craigton Cemetery in south-west Glasgow.

A marble bust of Robert Wallace Forsyth is on display at the People's Palace in Glasgow.

Edinburgh store History and architecture
The second building, erected as an Edinburgh flagship store in 1906–1907, was again designed by the Scottish architect John James Burnet. An extension, designed by the architects Burnet, Son & Dick was built in 1925. 

The facade is decorated with Neo-Baroque sculpture. At the corner on a ledge above the third floor, and directly above the entrance doors, stands a figure of a woman who holds a sewing machine. Also at the corner, and forming part of windowed aedicules at the second floor, are flanking tympanum relief sculptures of a longhaired figure driving a quadriga with an F (for Forsyth) on the front of the chariot. Running along an eaves gallery at the top of the building is a series - six on the Princes Street side, and four on the South St Andrews Street side - of term figures with fantastical heads by the Scottish sculptors William Birnie Rhind and William Reid Dick. On top of the corner tower sits a gigantic partly gilded steel sculpture of armillary sphere decorated with the signs of the zodiac and with three dancing putti, designed by the English sculptor Gilbert Bayes.

RW Forsyth Ltd was still in family ownership when it closed in 1983 after 111 years of trading.  The buildings were sold for development.

Gallery

References

Buildings and structures in Edinburgh
Buildings and structures completed in 1907
Department store buildings in the United Kingdom
Department stores of the United Kingdom
Category A listed buildings in Edinburgh